Don't Forget the Lyrics! is an international game show in the United States. The American show originally aired on Fox from July 11, 2007, to June 19, 2009, and after a year off the air, a third overall season, and first as a syndicated show, began on June 15, 2010, in daytime syndication and in primetime on VH1 and in primetime on MyNetworkTV on October 5, 2010. On March 24, 2011, the show was canceled. A new primetime version, hosted by Niecy Nash, debuted on FOX on May 23, 2022. The show has spun off to numerous countries outside America using different top prize or game format.

The primary difference between Don't Forget the Lyrics! and other music-based game shows is that artistic talent (such as the ability to sing or dance in an aesthetically pleasing way) is irrelevant to the contestants' chances of winning. In the words of one of their commercials prior to the first airing, "You don't have to sing it well; you just have to sing it right".

Gameplay
Each game is played by a single contestant who earns money incrementally based on a payout ladder by completing missing song lyrics on up to ten songs, testing the contestant's memory on songs. The following description of the show is based primarily on the U.S. version of Don't Forget the Lyrics!, though the general format applies to all international versions.

The contestant is presented and chooses from a set of nine different genres. Two different songs (some versions presented three) were then presented to the contestant to choose one to sing, then the host inform on how many missing words the contestant must provide. The band or an ensemble will play the music and sings along, karaoke-style until the music stops, in which the monitor will display blank lines. In some versions such as Taiwan version, an alert marker will inform the contestant on the upcoming line. The contestant then fills in the missing lyrics (indicated in ), and chose whether to risk their accumulated winnings by locking-in the lyrics (indicated in ). To advance to the next level, all the lyrics must be correct (indicated in ) without singing any incorrect words (indicated in ), otherwise the game ends and the contestant leaves with the last guaranteed amount or nothing depending on the level they lost. Before locking the lyrics, the contestant can end the game and leave with the current accumulated winnings won up to the point.

The contestant is also presented with three "Backups" that help the contestant but may only be used once throughout a game:
Backup Singer: The contestant receive assistance from one of two support members (or depending on version or game, an audience member or a team member) to help the contestant. The contestant may opt to choose their own lyrics or by going with their backup singer's lyrics if it is different.
Two Words: The contestant chooses any two of the missing words to complete the lyrics. In the Taiwanese version, Two Words backup provide only one missing word and is chosen at random.
Three Lines: The contestant is given a set of three lines, among which one line is correct; any common words that shares within the three lines are automatically highlighted green.

The contestant has no choice over the tenth and final song (usually with the generic genre mentioning the top prize amount, such as the "Million Dollar Song"), which is not revealed unless they risk their winnings and play on. In most versions, any unused backups before the final song are rendered unavailable to use. If the contestant completes the final lyric correctly, he or she wins the grand prize that varies from country to country.

In some versions, notably the Taiwanese version, the contestant is required to sing the lyrics correctly even during the sing-along, but missing too many lyrics while the music plays may prompt the player to stop singing and is given the option to either end the game or try again, or prematurely ending the game with the same penalty as incorrect lyrics given.

International versions
 Currently airing franchise
 Franchise no longer in production

Australia
The Australian version was rumoured to be airing on Network Ten in late 2008, with a jackpot of $A 500,000, after strong ratings to the US version over the summer non-ratings period. However, there has never been any confirmation and no production has begun. This may be due to lower ratings for episodes of the US version airing during the ratings period.

Austria
The Austrian version premiered on March 6, 2008, and aired on ATV titled Sing & Win. It is hosted by Rainhard Fendrich. The jackpot for this version is €50,000. So far, only one person managed to win the jackpot: the female singer Alexandra Poetzelsberger.

Croatia
The Croatian version premiered on March 17, 2008, and aired on Nova TV titled Ne zaboravi stihove!. It is hosted by Igor Mešin. The jackpot for this version is kn 500.000.

Denmark
The Danish version premiered 22 March 2008 (Easter Saturday) and aired on TV 2 Denmark titled Så det synger (So it sings). It is hosted by Michael Carøe. The jackpot for this version is DKr 500.000.

France

The French version premiered in December 2007 and aired on France 2, titled N'oubliez pas les paroles!. It is hosted by Nagui. The jackpot for this version is €100,000.
Since April 7, 2014, a new version is aired and the jackpot is now €20,000.
In the new version, there are 2 contestants and, at the end, only one (the finalist) can try to win at most €20,000, the other is eliminated. The finalist of the previous episode comes back in the next episode and tries to reach the final. When they lose, they keep all the money previously won.

In February 2020, Margaux E. became the candidate that won the biggest amount of money (€530,000). In January  2021, Jennifer won the biggest number of episodes (64).

A special episode, 100% Tubes, aired on 11 June 2016 featuring four pairs of celebrities playing for up to €150,000 to be split among their chosen charities.  In the final round, Gérard Holtz (sports journalist for France 2) and Amir (French representative at the Eurovision Song Contest 2016) worked together to win €90,000 for the four charities.

Greece

The Greek version premiered in November 2015 and is airing on Mega Channel, titled Den Eho Logia (I Have No Words). It is hosted by Greek actor and scriptwriter, Giorgos Kapoutzidis. The jackpot for this version is €10,000.

India
The Indian version premiered on November 9, 2007, and aired on STAR One titled Bol Baby Bol. It is hosted by Adnan Sami The jackpot for this version is Rs. 2,500,000/-. They have had one winner of the grand prize so far.

Indonesia
An Indonesian version, titled Missing Lyrics, airs on Trans TV. The top prize for this version is Rp. 100,000,000 (about US$10,000).

Iran
The Iranian version of Don't Forget the Lyrics called "Sher yadet nare" premiered on September 14, 2012, and aired on Manoto 1.Hosted by Omid Khalili Tajrishi. فارسى  The jackpot for this version is US$10,000.

Italy

The Italian version aired for a pilot in December 2007 on Italia 1 titled Canta e Vinci, then it had a season split between Spring and Summer. It is hosted by Amadeus & Checco Zalone. The jackpot for this version is €250,000.

The game show has come back on the air from 7 February 2022, on Nove presented by Gabriele Corsi, aired from Monday to Friday in access prime time with the title Don't Forget the Lyrics! - Stai sul pezzo.

Malaysia
The Malaysian version premiered on May 25, 2008, and aired on Astro Ria titled Jangan Lupa Lirik!. It is hosted by Aznil Nawawi The jackpot for this version is RM 1,000,000.

Mexico
The Mexican version was aired on TV Azteca and it is called ¿Te la sabes? Cántala.

Norway
The Norwegian version is hosted by Tshawe Baqwa and Yosef Wolde-Mariam from the Norwegian hip hop/rap band Madcon. It is aired on TV 2 (Norway).

Poland
The Polish version premiered on March 9, 2008, and aired on TVP2 titled Tak to leciało! (It was sung like that!). It was hosted by Maciej Miecznikowski. The jackpot for this version is zl 150,000. The reboot is planned for Fall 2022 on one of the main TVP channels with Sławomir Zapała as the host.

Singapore

The Singapore version, hosted by Singapore Idol host Gurmit Singh, premiered on 27 November 2008 on MediaCorp Channel 5. It airs every Thursday night at 8.00pm. Contestants will sing their way to the top prize of S$500,000 (S$50,000 for the second Chinese version).

Two Mandarin version of Don't Forget the Lyrics were aired, both airing on 8pm every Tuesdays. The first version premiered on 25 August 2009 was hosted by Taiwanese host Sam Tseng, and the series produced 14 episodes, four of which were celebrity episodes. The second version which featured entirely celebrities premiered on 1 June 2010, and was hosted by Singaporean comedian Mark Lee.

Slovakia
The Slovak version premiered on February 22, 2008, and aired on TV JOJ titled LYRICS - Vyspievaj si milión!. It is hosted by Andrej Bičan. The jackpot for this version is now €100,000 because Slovakia is joining the Eurozone, which results in the 1,000,000 crown prize being dropped.

Spain
The Spanish version premiered in September 2008 with the name "No te olvides de la canción" (Don't forget the song). It is aired at La Sexta and hosted by Operación Triunfo academy's former director Àngel Llàcer. The jackpot prize is €100,000.

Taiwan
The Taiwan version is called "" (Million Singer), hosted by Harlem Yu. This program is aired in Taiwan Television Enterprise, Ltd. (TTV) and TVBS Asia. The top prize is NT$300,000. The Taiwan version premiered on 10 May 2008 and ended on 11 August 2012. Unlike other versions, there is an alert system to indicate on the next line, and using a no-guarantee progression level (the contestant may not leave the game at any point, and the contestant loses half of the winnings won up to the point for any incorrect lyrics).

United Kingdom

The UK version premiered on May 11, 2008, and aired on Sky One titled Don't Forget the Lyrics!. It is hosted by Shane Richie. The jackpot for this version is £250,000.

United States

There have been three U.S. versions of Don't Forget the Lyrics!
 The original ran from July 11, 2007, to June 19, 2009, airing on Fox. It was hosted by Wayne Brady with a $1,000,000 jackpot.
 The second version premiered in September 2010 as a daily syndicated game show from 20th Television, and was hosted by Mark McGrath with a $50,000 jackpot.
 The revival version premiered on May 23, 2022, on Fox. It is hosted by Niecy Nash with a $1,000,000 jackpot.

See also
 The Singing Bee (American game show) - another lyrics-themed game show
 The Lyrics Board - another lyrics-themed game show
 Beat Shazam - another music-related game show
 I Can See Your Voice - another music-related game show

References

 
Banijay franchises
Television franchises